Panda vs. Aliens is a 2021 computer-animated sci-fi film, released on April 9, 2021. The film features The Unknowns, which are characters licensed from Stan Lee's POW! Entertainment.

Plot 
A group of aliens seek to conquer new worlds, and take particular notice of Earth, after seeing satellite broadcasts of TV shows of a powerful panda, Pandy.

Development 
The film was announced at Comic-Con. Modern Cinema Group signed on to co-finance the film with Stan Lee serving as an executive producer.

It is produced by China's Yisang Media and Los Angeles-Beijing Studios (LABS).

The movie was initially slated to be released in 2019, but eventually was released on April 9, 2021. The film was completed to "honor Stan Lee's final endeavors".

References 

2021 films
Canadian animated feature films
Canadian 3D films
Films about giant pandas
Arcana Studio titles
Films directed by Sean Patrick O'Reilly
2020s English-language films
2020s Canadian films